Meşeli is a village in the Mazıdağı District of Mardin Province in Turkey. The village is populated by Kurds of the Çayî tribe and had a population of 209 in 2021.

References 

Villages in Mazıdağı District
Kurdish settlements in Mardin Province